Akyulovo (Aqyul) is a rural locality (a village) in Akyulovsky Selsoviet, Khaybullinsky District, Bashkortostan, Russia. The population was 84 as of 2010. There are 2 streets.

Geography 
Akyulovo is located 70 km west of Akyar (the district's administrative centre) by road. Galiakhmetovo is the nearest rural locality.

References 

Rural localities in Khaybullinsky District